Dominique Lecrocq (7 July 1963 – 27 April 2014) was a French professional racing cyclist. He most notably won Paris–Bourges in 1986 and competed in the 1984 Vuelta a España.

He died of a heart attack on 27 April 2014 at the age of 50.

Major results

Road

1984
 3rd Grand Prix de la Ville de Rennes
1985
 1st Prologue Tour d'Armorique
 9th Grand Prix d'Isbergues
1986
 1st  Overall Paris–Bourges
1st Stage 1
 1st Grand Prix de Mauléon-Moulins
 3rd 
 4th Overall Vuelta a Murcia
1987
 5th Grand Prix de Mauléon-Moulins

Track

1980
 1st  Individual pursuit, National Junior Track Championships
1981
 1st  Team pursuit, National Junior Track Championships
 3rd  Team pursuit, UCI World Junior Track Championships
1985
 1st  Points race, National Track Championships
1986
 National Track Championships
1st  Madison (with Didier Garcia)
2nd Sprint
3rd Points race

References

External links

Sportspeople from Reims
1963 births
2014 deaths
French male cyclists
Cyclists from Grand Est
French track cyclists